Transmembrane protein 261 is a protein that in humans is encoded by the TMEM261 gene located on chromosome 9. TMEM261 is also known as C9ORF123 and DMAC1, Chromosome 9 Open Reading Frame 123 and Transmembrane Protein C9orf123 and Distal membrane-arm assembly complex protein 1.

Gene features
TMEM261 is located at 9p24.1, its length is 91,891 base pairs (bp) on the reverse strand. Its neighbouring gene is PTPRD located at 9p23-p24.3 also on the reverse strand and encodes protein tyrosine phosphatase receptor type delta.
TMEM261 has 2 exons and 1 intron, and 6 primary transcript variants; the largest mRNA transcript variant consisting of 742bp with a protein 129 amino acids (aa) in length and 13,500 Daltons (Da) in size, and the smallest coding transcript variant being 381bp with a protein 69aa long and 6,100 Da in size.

Protein features
TMEM261 is a protein consisting out of 112 amino acids, with a molecular weight of 11.8 kDa. The isoelectric point is predicted to be 10.2, whilst its posttranslational modification value is 9.9.

Structure 

TMEM261 contains a domain of unknown function, DUF4536 (pfam15055), predicted as a helical membrane spanning domain about 45aa (Cys 47- Ser 92) in length with no known domain relationships. Two further transmembrane helical domains are predicted of lengths 18aa (Val 52-Ala 69) and 23aa (Pro 81-Ala 102]). There is also a low complexity region spanning 25aa (Thr 14-Ala 39). The tertiary structure for TMEM261 has not yet been determined. However, its protein secondary structure is mostly composed of coiled-coil regions with beta strands and alpha helices found within the transmembrane and domain of unknown function regions. The N-terminal region of TMEM261 is composed of a disordered region which contains the low complexity region  that is not highly conserved amongst orthologues.

Modifications 

A N-myristoylation domain is shown to be present in most TMEM261 protein variants. Post-translational modifications include myristoylation of the N-terminal Glycine residue (Gly2) of the TMEM261 protein as well as phosphorylation of Threonine 31.

Interactions 

Proteins shown to interact with TMEM261 include NAAA (protein-protein interaction), QTRT1 (RNA-protein interaction),ZC4H2(DNA-protein interaction) and ZNF454(DNA-protein interaction). It has also shown to interact with APP(protein-protein interaction), ARHGEF38(protein-protein interaction) and HNRNPD(RNA-protein interaction).
Additional transcription factor binding sites (DNA-protein interaction) predicted include one binding site for MEF2C a monocyte-specific enhancement factor that is involved in muscle-cell regulation particularly in the cardiovascular system and two binding sites for GATA1 which is a globin transcription factor 1 involved in erythroblast development regulation.

Expression
TMEM261 shows ubiquitous expression in humans and is detected in almost all tissue types. It shows tissue-enriched gene (TEG) expression when compared to housekeeping gene (HKG) expression. Its highest expression is seen in the heart (overall relative expression 94%) particularly in heart fibroblast cells, thymus (overall relative expression 90%), and thyroid (overall relative expression 93%) particularly in thyroid glandular cells. Staining intensity of cancer cells showed intermediate to high expression in breast, colorectal, ovarian, skin, urothelial, head and neck cells.

Function

Currently the function for TMEM261 is unknown. However, gene amplification and rearrangements of its locus have been associated with various cancers including colorectal cancer, 
breast cancer and lymphomas.

Evolution

Orthologues 

The orthologues and homologues of TMEM261 are limited to vertebrates, its oldest homologue dates to that of the cartilaginous fishes which diverged from Homo sapiens 462.5  million years ago.  The protein primary structure of TMEM261 shows higher overall conservation in mammals, however high conservation of the domain of unknown function (DUF4536) to the C-terminus region is seen in all orthologues, including distant homologues. The protein structure of TMEM261 shows conservation across most orthologues.

Paralogues 

TMEM261 has no known paralogs.

References

External links
 PubMed
 NCBI gene record
 GeneCards
 UCSC Genome Browser
 Expasy Bioinformatics Resource Portal
 SDSC Biology Workbench
 Uniprot
 HUGO

Further reading

Proteins
Genes